In case G 1/15, the Enlarged Board of Appeal of the European Patent Office (EPO) affirmed the concept of partial priority. That is, a patent claim in a European patent application or European patent may partially benefit from the priority of an earlier application.

History
The questions referred to the Enlarged Board of Appeal under  sought "to clarify how Article 88(2), second sentence, EPC is to be applied in the light of the Enlarged Board's decision G 2/98 in cases where a claim encompasses, without spelling them out, alternative subject-matters having all the features of the claim (known as a generic "OR"-claim), and whether parent and divisional applications may be prior art under  against one another in respect of subject-matter disclosed in a priority application but not entitled to priority."

The case, triggered by decision T 557/13 issued on 17 July 2015 by Board of Appeal 3.3.06, had led the President of the EPO to decide that "all proceedings before EPO examining and opposition divisions in which the decision depends entirely" on the outcome of the case were to "be stayed ex officio until the Enlarged Board issues its decision". The case attracted more than thirty amicus curiae briefs. Oral proceedings were held on 7 June 2016 at the EPO in Munich, Germany.

The order, which was issued on November 29, 2016, reads: 

The full reasoned decision was issued in February 2017.

See also
 Amendments under the European Patent Convention

References

Further reading

External links
Reasoned decision G 1/15
Technical Board of Appeal decision T 0557/13 from Board 3.3.06, from which the referral originates (regarding  - see also European Patent Register entry)
Notice from the European Patent Office dated 2 October 2015 concerning the staying of proceedings due to referral G 1/15 (EPO Official Journal, 2015, A92)

G 2015 1